The Dornier Museum Friedrichshafen is an aerospace museum located in the German town of Friederichshafen near Lake Constance. The museum exhibits the aircraft designs of Claude Dornier, the Dornier company and aerospace products of Airbus.

Exhibits 
Displayed at the museum are Dornier aircraft types (including licensed-production), unmanned aerial vehicles, models and historical photographs, plus aerospace equipment including satellites.

Aircraft
Exhibits include the following aircraft types, among other things like a car and Startrek memorabilia:

Bell UH-1D, Breguet Atlantic, Canadair CL-289, Dassault/Dornier Alpha Jet, Dornier Merkur, Dornier Do J Wal (Replica), Dornier Do 27, Dornier Do 28 A1, Dornier Do 28 D Skyservant, Dornier Do 29, Dornier Do 31 E1, Dornier 228, Dornier 328, Dornier Kiebitz, Fiat G.91.

Engines
A number of aircraft engines used by Dornier aircraft types are also displayed, among them :

Daimler-Benz DB 603 (Powered the Dornier Do 335), Bristol Siddeley Pegasus 5–2 (Main engine for the Dornier Do 31), Rolls-Royce RB 162-4D (Lift engine for the Dornier Do 31)

Satellites
GEOS, ISEE-B, Ulysses – First inter-planetary probe to the poles of the sun, European Remote-Sensing Satellite

Gallery

See also
List of aerospace museums

References

External links

  

Aerospace museums in Germany
Museums in Baden-Württemberg
Museums established in 2009
2009 establishments in Germany
Friedrichshafen